Happy Louie, born Louis George Dusseault on August 4, 1934 in Ware,_Massachusetts, was a musician and leader of the Happy Louie and Julcia's Polka Band. He received a Grammy nomination for Best Polka Album in 1995. He was inducted to the International Polka Association Polka Hall of Fame in 1982.  His MGM original recording of Accordion A go-go was featured in a major motion picture. He was born in Ware, Massachusetts and lived in Wilbraham, Massachusetts before passing away on November 26, 2021.

Awards 
2006: Citizen of the Year, Polish American's Citizens Club, Ludlow, Ma
1995: Grammy Nomination
1987: Polka Band of the Year, WESO
1982: Polka Music Hall of Fame, International Polka Association
1977: Polka Band of the Year, WESO
1975: Citizen of the Year, Polish American World
1970: Best Polka Album, International Polka Association
1970: Best Single Recording, International Polka Association
1970: Polka Band of the Year, WESO
1968: Best Polka Album, International Polka Association
1966: Polka Band of the Year, WESO

Discography

References

Polka musicians
Bandleaders
Grammy Award winners
Musicians from Massachusetts
People from South Hadley, Massachusetts
People from Wilbraham, Massachusetts